Finchingfield is a village in the Braintree district in north-west Essex, England, a primarily rural area.

Nearby villages include Great Bardfield, Great Sampford, and Wethersfield.

History
There has been a settlement in Finchingfield since historical records of the area began. Also, there is archaeological evidence for a Roman villa 400 metres south-southwest of the village church. The place-name 'Finchingfield ' is first attested in the Domesday Book of 1086, where it appears as Fincingefelda, a name that means 'the field of Finc or his people'.
The village was an official stop for horse-drawn coaches travelling from London to Norwich.

Spains Hall, the nearby Elizabethan country house, was built in the early fifteenth century. The hall is named after Hervey de Ispania, who held the manor at the time of the 1086 Domesday Book. Since then, the land has been owned by four families: the de Ispania family, the Kempe family, who acquired it when Margery de Ispania married Nicholas Kempe in the early fifteenth century, the Ruggles family (later the Ruggles-Brise family), and currently celebrity chef Jamie Oliver with wife Jools and their 5 children. The hall was the hub of the community, those families owning much of the village, and employing most of the villagers.

Community
Finchingfield and Cornish Hall End combined had a population of 1,471 at the United Kingdom Census 2011.

The ecclesiastical parish covering Finchingfield includes Cornish Hall End, Shalford, and Wethersfield.

Societies and clubs founded in Finchingfield, include The Finchingfield Society, the Horticultural Society, the Royal British Legion, and Finchingfield Cricket Club.

It often is called the most beautiful village in England, a "picture-postcard" village and one of the most photographed, with a duck pond and village green surrounded by Georgian and medieval cottages; St John the Baptist Church on the hill; an eighteenth-century windmill; three public houses; Post Office; tea rooms; a hall; a primary school; and a doctor's surgery.
It often has appeared in television programmes, films, and commercials, as well as on chocolate boxes, biscuit tins, and other products.

Finchingfield was the home and is the burial place of Dodie Smith, whose books include The Hundred and One Dalmatians (1956).

The 2013 Sky series Chickens was filmed in the village. The series concerns three young men who avoided going to fight during the First World War, written by and starring Simon Bird and Joe Thomas.

The village is on the route of the Dunwich Dynamo annual cycle ride.

Notable people

Thomas Howard, 21st Earl of Arundel
Norman Lewis, travel writer, novelist, founder of Survival International
Dodie Smith, author of The Hundred and One Dalmatians
A J A Symons, author of The Quest For Corvo, an acclaimed biography of the author Frederick Rolfe.
Janie Terrero (1858 – 1944), militant suffragette born here.
Jamie Oliver, chef, TV personality and author

Gallery

See also
The Hundred Parishes

References

External links

 Images of Finchingfield
 Cliff Lawson's tribute to Finchingfield

 
Villages in Essex
Civil parishes in Essex
Braintree District